A sociocultural system is a "human population viewed ouyess(1) in its ecological context and (2) as one of the many subsystems of a larger ecological system".
 The term "sociocultural system" embraces three concepts: society, culture, and system. A society is a number of interdependent organisms of the same species.  A culture is the learned behaviors that are shared by the members of a society, together with the material products of such behaviors. The words "society" and "culture" are fused together to form the word "sociocultural". A system is "a collection of parts which interact with each other to function as a whole". The term sociocultural system is most likely to be found in the writings of anthropologists who specialize in ecological anthropology.

In 1979, Marvin Harris outlined a universal structure of sociocultural systems. He mentioned infrastructure (production and population), structure (which is behavioural, like corporations, political organizations, hierarchies, castes), and a superstructure (which is mental, like beliefs, values, norms).

See also

References

Structure
Complex systems theory